
This is an incomplete list of paintings by the French artist Pierre Mignard.

Mignard, Pierre